American Football (also known as LP2) is the eponymous second studio album by American rock band American Football, released on October 21, 2016 through Polyvinyl.

American Football is the second self-titled album by American Football and the first release since their debut self-titled album  American Football in September 1999 and disbandment in 2000. In April 2014, American Football announced they would be reforming after fifteen years for a number of live performances, playing shows through the year and into 2015. In early 2016, American Football began recording the second album with Jason Cupp at ARC Studios in Omaha, Nebraska, and at SHIRK Studios in Chicago, Illinois.

Background
American Football released their debut self-titled album in September 1999 through Polyvinyl. The band broke up due to the members no longer living in the same city and their college courses coming to an end. Vocalist/guitarist Mike Kinsella said that they "never had any ambitious goals. [...] we weren't kids who wanted to [...] tour all summer." Kinsella and guitarist Steve Holmes both moved to Chicago and remained in contact at first. Meanwhile, drummer Steve Lamos moved to Colorado, later becoming a professor. Kinsella wanted to form a new group where he had full creative control, eventually creating the project Owen.

In April 2014 American Football announced they were reuniting for live performances. Holmes said the group realized that "the time was ripe for three middle aged dudes to play some old songs about teenage feelings, and stand around tuning guitars for a long time." American Football, with the addition of Kinsella's cousin Nate playing bass, played a surprise show in August in Chicago. They then followed this up with playing a festival in September, then three shows in New York. Further dates running into December were also played, as well as the band's first UK shows the following May.

Composition
The majority of the group's songs are created from Kinsella and Holmes' intertwining guitar parts. Kinsella described "Give Me the Gun" as "just me checking in on a distressed loved one done in my best Bernard Sumner impersonation".

Recording
The album was recorded in April 2016 at ARC Studios, located in Omaha, Nebraska, and SHIRK Studios, located in Chicago, Illinois. Production duties were handled by the group and Jason Cupp.

Release
On August 23, 2016, the band's second self-titled album was announced for release. On the same day, "I've Been So Lost for So Long" was made available for streaming, and the album's cover art and track listing was revealed. On September 7, "Give Me the Gun" was made available for streaming. "Desire Gets in the Way" was released to radio on October 5. American Football was released on October 21 through Polyvinyl in the U.S. and through Wichita in Europe. The group will perform a series of release shows in Chicago, New York, Los Angeles and London. The cover of the album was the interior of the same house as featured on their eponymous debut album or best known as "American Football house".

Reception

American Football received positive reviews from critics. Review aggregation website Metacritic assigned a normalized score of 78/100, indicating "generally favorable reviews", based on 19 critic reviews.

Accolades

Track listing

Charts

References
Citations

Sources

 

2016 albums
American Football (band) albums
Polyvinyl Record Co. albums